The 1971 All-Ireland Senior Football Championship Final was the 84th All-Ireland Final and the deciding match of the 1971 All-Ireland Senior Football Championship, an inter-county Gaelic football tournament for the top teams in Ireland. 

Galway were appearing in their first final since the three-in-a-row side of the 1960s. Offaly, who had never won an All-Ireland title, had last contested a final in 1969.

Galway were favourites. Instead a shock occurred. A Murt Connor goal gave Offaly their first title. However, with the duration of certain championship matches increasing from 60 to 80 minutes during the 1970s before being settled at 70 minutes after five seasons of this in 1975, this is the only All-Ireland final whose outcome would have changed if the time had remained the same; had it done so, the 1971 final would have ended in a draw.

This was the first All-Ireland final attended by Martin Breheny. The weather on the day was later described by Breheny as consisting of a "steady drizzle" in the first half, followed by a "deluge of monsoon proportions" during the second half.

It would be a further 21 years before another team won their first All-Ireland Senior Football Championship.

References

External links

All-Ireland Senior Football Championship Final
All-Ireland Senior Football Championship Final, 1971
All-Ireland Senior Football Championship Finals
All-Ireland Senior Football Championship Finals
Galway county football team matches
Offaly county football team matches